Hugó Ballya (20 July 1908 – 8 January 1995) was a Hungarian rower. He competed at the 1936 Summer Olympics in Berlin with the men's eight where they came fifth.

References

1908 births
1995 deaths
Hungarian male rowers
Olympic rowers of Hungary
Rowers at the 1936 Summer Olympics
Sportspeople from Košice
European Rowing Championships medalists